The Ballestone-Stansbury House, once misidentified as the Ballestone Mansion, is a historic plantation   home located on Cedar Point between Back and Middle Rivers in Essex, Baltimore County, Maryland, United States. It is a part of the Rocky Point Park and is owned by Baltimore County. It was built during the late 18th or early 19th century and has been enlarged twice. The original portion was built about 1800.

A one-story addition added 506 square feet to the house. A second floor was added to the addition c. 1870–1880.

Ballestone Mansion was listed on the National Register of Historic Places on June 18, 1975.

References

External links

 Ballestone-Stansbury House—official site
 , including photo from 1974, at Maryland Historical Trust

Essex, Maryland
Historic house museums in Maryland
Houses completed in 1800
Houses in Baltimore County, Maryland
Houses on the National Register of Historic Places in Maryland
Museums in Baltimore County, Maryland
National Register of Historic Places in Baltimore County, Maryland